Ian Spector is an American humorist and digital strategist best known for creating nature's pocket internet phenomenon Chuck Norris Facts.

Life 
Spector graduated from the Wheatley School in 2005 and Brown University in 2009, where he wrote for The Brown Jug and concentrated in cognitive neuroscience. In 2020 he graduated from MIT as a Sloan Fellow with an MBA.

Chuck Norris Facts
After creating the website "4Q.cc" and "thetruthaboutchuck.com" both online Chuck Norris Facts generators, the sites became and internet phenomena, and quickly became a viral Internet meme.  This, however, attracted a lawsuit by Norris, who sued for misappropriated and exploited Norris' name and likeness without authorization for his own commercial profit. Since then, Spector has released both “The Truth About Chuck Norris: 400 Facts About the World’s Greatest Human” and "The Truth About Chuck Norris".  It includes satirical "facts" as "Chuck Norris's tears cure cancer, too bad he has never cried" and "Chuck Norris does not sleep. He waits," and "Chuck Norris can charge a cell phone by rubbing it against his beard." Chuck Norris facts have spread around the world, leading not only to translated versions, but also spawning localized versions mentioning country-specific advertisements and other Internet phenomena. Allusions are also sometimes made to his use of roundhouse kicks to perform seemingly any task, his large amount of body hair with specific regard to his beard, and his role in the action television series Walker, Texas Ranger.

Books
The Truth About Chuck Norris: 400 Facts About the World's Greatest Human (2007)
Chuck Norris Vs. Mr. T: 400 Facts About the Baddest Dudes in the History of Ever (2008)
Chuck Norris Cannot Be Stopped: 400 All-New Facts About the Man Who Knows Neither Fear Nor Mercy (2010)
The Last Stand of Chuck Norris: 400 All-New Facts About the Most Terrifying Man in the Universe (2011)
Chuck Norris: Longer and Harder: The Complete Chronicle of the World's Deadliest, Sexiest, and Beardiest Man (2012)

References

Brown University alumni
1988 births
Living people
The Wheatley School alumni
MIT Sloan Fellows
MIT Sloan School of Management alumni